In single-variable differential calculus, the fundamental increment lemma is an immediate consequence of the definition of the derivative f(a) of a function f at a point a:

The lemma asserts that the existence of this derivative implies the existence of a function  such that 

for sufficiently small but non-zero h. For a proof, it suffices to define

and verify this  meets the requirements.

Differentiability in higher dimensions 
In that the existence of  uniquely characterises the number , the fundamental increment lemma can be said to characterise the differentiability of single-variable functions. For this reason, a generalisation of the lemma can be used in the definition of differentiability in multivariable calculus. Then f is said to be differentiable at a if there is a linear function 
 
and a function 
 
such that 

for non-zero h sufficiently close to 0. In this case, M is the unique derivative (or total derivative, to distinguish from the directional and partial derivatives) of f at a. Notably, M is given by the Jacobian matrix of f evaluated at a.

See also 
Generalizations of the derivative

References 

Differential calculus